Trey E. Burke III (born November 4, 2004) is an American professional racing driver. Trey is a 4th generation driver from Texas who started on dirt at 9 years old.  He competes in the U.S. F2000 National Championship for Joe Dooling Autosports, The highlight of Trey's young career is winning the International Motor Contest Association Sprint Car Series National Rookie of the Year as the youngest ever at age 14.

Racing career

On July 4, 2022, it was announced that Burke would make his NASCAR debut in the Truck Series, driving for Young's Motorsports in the race at Mid-Ohio. On September 9, it was revealed that Burke would return to Young's Motorsports to make his ARCA Menards Series debut driving the team's No. 02 car at Toledo Speedway, although he nor the team would not appear on the entry list for the race.

Racing record

Career summary

*Season still in progress.

American open-wheel racing results

U.S. F2000 National Championship
(key) (Races in bold indicate pole position) (Races in italics indicate fastest lap) (Races with * indicate most race laps led)

*Season still in progress.

NASCAR
(key) (Bold – Pole position awarded by qualifying time. Italics – Pole position earned by points standings or practice time. * – Most laps led.)

Camping World Truck Series

 Season still in progress

References

2004 births
Living people
Racing drivers from Texas
U.S. F2000 National Championship drivers

Indy Pro 2000 Championship drivers
NASCAR drivers